Sir Richard Clarence Kirby AC (22 September 190425 October 2001) was a long serving president of the Australian Commonwealth Conciliation and Arbitration Commission (1956-1973) (having first been appointed to the Commission in 1947).  In 1973, because of ill health, he retired from this post.

He was also a member of the Australian War Crimes Commission.

His biography was written by Blanche d'Alpuget in 1977.

Honours
Richard Kirby was knighted in the New Year's Honours of 1961.  He was appointed a Companion of the Order of Australia (AC) in the Australian Day Honours of 1985.

The bi-annual Sir Richard Kirby Lecture is now held in his honour.  It was often assumed he was the father of former High Court judge Michael Kirby (who has delivered the Sir Richard Kirby Lecture), but they were not related.

References

Sources 
 d'Alpuget, Blanche (1977), Mediator: A biography of Sir Richard Kirby
 Justice Michael Kirby: Sir Richard Kirby Lecture "SIR RICHARD KIRBY, MEDIATION AND INDUSTRIAL RELATIONS TODAY", 20 November 1996

1904 births
2001 deaths
20th-century Australian judges
Australian Knights Bachelor
Companions of the Order of Australia